The American Champion Female Turf Horse award is an American Thoroughbred horse racing honor. It is part of the Eclipse Awards program and is awarded annually to a female horse (filly or mare) for her performance on grass race courses.

Until 1978 there was a Best Turf Horse award, open to both male and female horse. During this time, Dahlia was the only filly voted Best Turf Horse. In 1979 an individual category was created for each of the sexes.

Records
Most wins:
 2 – Miesque (1987, 1988)
 2 – Flawlessly (1992, 1993)
 2 – Ouija Board (2004, 2006)
 2 – Goldikova (2009, 2010)
 2 – Tepin (2015, 2016)

Most wins by a trainer:
 7 – Chad Brown (2012, 2014, 2017, 2018, 2019, 2020, 2022)

Most wins by an owner:
 4 – Khalid Abdullah (1996, 1997, 2001, 2005)

Honorees

References
 The Eclipse Awards at the Thoroughbred Racing Associations of America, Inc.
 The Bloodhorse.com Champion's history charts

Horse racing awards
Horse racing in the United States